Manipur, a state in India, has sixteen administrative districts.

Administration
A district of an Indian state is an administrative geographical unit, headed by a district magistrate or a deputy commissioner, an officer belonging to the Indian Administrative Service. The district magistrate or the deputy commissioner is assisted by a number of officials belonging to different wings of the administrative services of the state.

A superintendent of Police, an officer belonging to Indian Police Service is entrusted with the responsibility of maintaining law and order and related issues.

On 9 December 2016, the government created 7 new districts, bringing the total number of districts to 16.

Districts
The sixteen districts of Manipur state are:

Demographics

Languages

° has many different dialects

Subdivisions

References 

 
Manipur
Districts